Nalluru is a village in Guntur district of the Indian state of Andhra Pradesh. It is located in Repalle mandal of Tenali revenue division.

Governance 

Nalluru gram panchayat is the local self-government of the village. It is divided into wards and each ward is represented by a ward member. The elected members of the gram panchayat is headed by a sarpanch.

See also 
List of villages in Guntur district

References 

Villages in Guntur district